Gon or GON may refer to:

Arts
 Gon (manga), a Japanese manga series
 Gon (video game), a 1994 video game for the Super Famicon
 Gon Freecss, the main character from the manga series Hunter × Hunter
 Gon, the Little Fox, a Japanese children's story
 Gon: Baku Baku Baku Baku Adventure, a 2012 video game for the Nintendo 3DS

People
 Taika Gon (1906–1971), Korean runner
 Masashi Nakayama (born 1967), Japanese soccer player

Other uses
 Gon (unit), a unit of plane angle
 Gon, Burkina Faso
 Gondi language
 Government of Norway
 Greater occipital nerve
 Groton–New London Airport, in Connecticut, United States